Tabaning Sita Forest Park is a Forest Park in the Gambia. It covers 16 hectares.

References

Forest parks of the Gambia